The Mochuan River is a right-bank tributary of the upper Xiang River in Xin'an County, Guangxi, China. The river rises in the west of Panhuang Temple in Mochuan Township and flows south to north, joining the Xiang at Qukou of Yujiang Village, Xiangli Town.

References

Rivers of Hunan